Man Exposed (Finnish: Riisuttu mies ) is a 2006 Finnish comedy-drama film directed by Aku Louhimies about a rebel minister who is suddenly asked to run for bishop. At the same time, he is running into problems in his marriage. The film stars Samuli Edelman, Mikko Kouki, and Matleena Kuusniemi. .

Accolades
 Jussi Awards 2007:
 Jussi 	Best Supporting Actor - Mikko Kouki
 Tallinn Black Nights Film Festival 2006:
 Jury Prize 	Best Actor - Samuli Edelmann

External links
 

2006 films
2006 comedy-drama films
Films directed by Aku Louhimies
Finnish comedy-drama films